Concord Academy is an independent, state approved, non-profit school (grades 6–12) for students with learning differences such as learning disabilities, ADD/ADHD, Autism, and other categories of disability that might prevent students from learning in a regular class setting or school. Sometimes the students they serve are challenged with a single, or more special learning consideration or a defined social-emotional need. Much more often, however, these children face a combination of disabling factors that require modifications in all subject areas and a variety of programs to address unique needs. Concord provides a flexible curriculum and specialized programming within a small, nurturing, personal environment in which students feel they can learn and gain confidence and independence. Concord students join a community that embraces their differences, honors their learning styles, and accommodates their needs. Current students say they can be themselves at Concord, and their differences are not just accepted, but celebrated. Concord students receive individualized supports in academics, social skills, life skills, and in transitioning into life after high school. The school faculty and staff value the students’ neurodiversity and work with them to leverage their learning differences so that they gain the independence and confidence needed for success. All Concord Academy teachers are licensed in the state of Tennessee and have an endorsement in Special Education.

History
Concord Academy was founded in 1983 by a group of concerned parents who recognized that their children with learning differences were falling behind or falling through the cracks in traditional educational settings. Concord was established to provide the best environment for student growth in all aspects of development, including specialized academic instruction, post-secondary readiness, and social/emotional intelligence.

Headmasters 
Cece Palazola (2019–present)
Nan Miller (2012–2019)
Joyce Teague (1987–2012)
Dr. Wallace Flint (1983–1987)

External links 
 Concord Academy Website

Schools in Memphis, Tennessee
Private high schools in Tennessee
Private middle schools in Tennessee